Corey Sobel is an American author and former linebacker for the Duke Blue Devils. His debut novel, The Redshirt, was a finalist for the 2020 Center for Fiction First Novel Prize.

External links

http://columbiareviewmag.com/2021/10/interview-with-corey-sobel/

https://debutiful.net/2020/10/13/the-redshirt-by-corey-sobel-is-a-football-novel-for-non-football-fans/

https://www.esquire.com/sports/a34363345/corey-sobel-the-redshirts-book-ncaa-college-football-interview-2020/

References

21st-century American novelists
Living people
Year of birth missing (living people)